D.I.G.I.T.A.L. is a compilation album by American MC KRS-One. It was released in November 2003 via Front Page Entertainment and is composed of a number of songs previously only released on white label 12" singles and B-sides with a few remixes and KRS-One cameos on other artist records.

Many of the tracks here have been given different titles from their original releases. For example, "As You Already Know" was originally released as a single by Truck Turner under the name "Symphony 2000" while "When The Moon" was called "Aquarius" when it first was released as a limited KRS-One 12" single around 1999.

Track listing
 "Intro: You Know What's Up!"
 "For Example"
Incorporates lyrics from "Get Your Self Up" by KRS-One
 "Tell the Devil Ha!"
Contains a sample from "Dernier Domicile Connu" by François de Roubaix
 "When the Moon"
Featuring: Courtney Terry
 "Free Mumia"
Featuring: Channel Live
Contains a sample from "Hard to Handle" by Otis Redding
 "Ah Yeah!"
 "Bring It to the Cypher"
Featuring: Truck Turner
Produced by DJ Premier
 "As You Already Know"
Featuring: Truck Turner, Big Punisher, Kool G Rap
Contains a sample from "The Symphony" by Juice Crew
 "A Freestyle Song"
Featuring: Common
 "Article (Remix)"
Featuring: Mad Lion, Shelly Thunder, Whitey Don
 "Music for the '90s"
Featuring: G. Simone
Produced by Kid Capri
Contains a sample from "Why Is That?" by BDP
 "Let It Flow (Get You in the Mood)"
Featuring: Courtney Terry
 "Remember"
 "No Wack DJ's"
 "We Don't Care Anymore"
 "Smilin' Faces"
Featuring: Shock G.
 "Hiphop Vs. Rap"
 "Woop! Woop! (Showbiz Remix)"
Incorporates "Sound of da Police" by KRS-One
 "Harmony and Understanding"
 "Outro: I'll Be Back"

References

2003 compilation albums
KRS-One albums
Albums produced by Showbiz (producer)
Albums produced by DJ Premier
Cleopatra Records compilation albums